"Walk Away / Jailbreak" is a split 7" single by the Burden Brothers and the Supersuckers.  It was released in 2005 on Kitty Play Records

Track listing
 Burden Brothers - "Walk Away (live)" (Bentley)
 Supersuckers - "Jailbreak" (Lynott) - 3:38

Personnel
 Burden Brothers
 Vaden Lewis - vocals and guitar
 Corey Rozzoni - backing vocals and guitar
 Casey Orr - backing vocals and bass guitar
 Taz Bentley - backing vocals, drums, percussion, and guitar
 Casey Hess - backing vocals and guitar
 Supersuckers

Songs about prison
2005 singles
Burden Brothers songs
Supersuckers songs